Nicholas Francis Markham, Baron Markham,  (born 13 February 1968) is chair of London & Continental Railways. He is the co-founder of COVID-19 testing company Cignpost Diagnostics & ExpressTest, a non-executive director of Inchora Limited, and the Department for Work and Pensions. He has been serving as Parliamentary Under-Secretary of State in the Department of Health and Social Care since 2022.

Early life 
Markham was born in Haywards Heath. The son of advertising executive and Goodwood racecourse director Peter Jones, CBE, and nurse Judy Markham, he has four siblings. Markham attended Downlands Comprehensive School in Sussex, then studied A Levels at Haywards Heath Sixth Form College. He attended the London School of Economics and Political Science (LSE) from 1986 to 1989 and earned a bachelor's degree in economics. He is a keen tennis, football (notably representing Westminster Casuals FC), and rugby player and has always been passionate about politics, making the Conservative Society the biggest political club at LSE. He was selected to stand for Westminster City Council whilst still a student, and in 1990, aged 22, he was elected as the youngest councillor, and became the youngest chair of education, aged 25, and deputy leader and chair of finance, aged 27.

DWP 
In July 2020 he was appointed Lead Non-executive director for Department for Work and Pensions, where he works closely with the Secretary of State and the Permanent Secretary advising the department on how best to implement policies. In particular he utilises his housing experience to ensure the department provides best value for its £25 billion per annum housing benefit spend.

COVID-19 

At the beginning of the pandemic, he set up a charity, Project Little Boat, to deliver PPE and other essential equipment, with Denis Kinane. Markham then co-founded Cignpost Diagnostics with Denis Kinane and Steve Whatley and is the Commercial Lead responsible for building the business. Cignpost has worked with elite sports, film production, travel and banking sectors to ensure they have a safe COVID-19-free working environment and under the consumer brand ExpressTest, to help the public travel safely.  Markham's position in Cignpost lead to questions about a possible conflict of interest as in early 2023 Markham is a health minister.   Markham’s does not mention Cignpost in his biography for the Department for Health website.

Career

Markham is chairman of London & Continental Railways which is the government specialist for regeneration around railways including Kings Cross and the Stratford Olympic site.
He is setting up a shared ownership solution, AnyNest, with housing charity Safe Haven, helping people onto the housing ladder. Previously he was the lead non-executive director for the Ministry of Housing, Communities and Local Government since January 2013, where he also chaired the Audit and Risk Committee. He was strategy director at ITV where he led the merger integration of Carlton Television (now ITV London) and Granada and developed the concept of Freeview alongside the BBC.

From 1990 to 1998, Markham was a councillor and deputy leader of Westminster City Council. 

He was CFO for Laura Ashley where he led the financial restructuring of the business.

He was chief executive of Top Up TV, which supplied a range of linear pay TV channels on DTT including Sky Sports 1, 2 and ESPN and which provides conditional-access modules (CAMs) and technical services to BT Vision. According to the Government website Gov.uk Top Up TV was the first successful pay TV operator on digital terrestrial television in the world.

Markham was appointed Commander of the Order of the British Empire (CBE) in the 2022 Birthday Honours for services to the economy and government.

On 22 September 2022, he was appointed Parliamentary Under-Secretary of State in the Department of Health and Social Care. On 7 October 2022, to facilitate his ministerial role, he was created Baron Markham, of East Horsley in the County of Surrey, and was introduced to the House of Lords on 10 October 2022. He sits as a Conservative peer. His was the first life peerage created during Charles III's reign.

Personal life 
Markham lives in Surrey with wife Dr Ingrid Batista and their son Xavi. He also has two older children Ben and Sam.

References

1968 births
Living people
British business executives
Railway executives
People from Haywards Heath
Alumni of the London School of Economics
British businesspeople
Councillors in the City of Westminster
Commanders of the Order of the British Empire
Conservative Party (UK) life peers
Life peers created by Charles III